The Pack (Spanish: La jauría) is a 2022 Colombian-French drama film written and directed by Andrés Ramírez Pulido in his directorial debut. In May 2022, it won the Critics' Week Award at the 75th Cannes Film Festival. In the same month, Ramírez Pulido received the Society of Dramatic Authors and Composers award for his work on the film. The film was nominated in the Best Ibero-American Film category at the 37th Goya Awards.

Synopsis 
In an experimental rehabilitation center in the middle of the jungle, Eliú pays a sentence for murder. When their best friend and accomplice is transferred to the same place, the young people must rebuild their crime and face a past that Eliú wants to get away from. In the midst of therapies and forced labor, Eliú will face the darkness of human nature and will try to escape from his own before it is too late.

Cast 
The actors participating in this film are:

 Jhojan Estiven Jimenez as Eliú
 Maicol Andrés Jimenez as El Mono
 Diego Rincón as Godoy
 Miguel Viera as Álvaro
 Carlos Steven Blanco as Le frère d'Eliú
 Ricardo Alberto Parra as Juan Macias
 Jhoani Barreto as Ider
 Marleyda Soto as Tránsito
 Wismer Vásquez as Calate

Release 
The film had its international premiere in May as part of International Critics Week at the 75th Cannes Film Festival. It premiered on October 20, 2022 in Colombian theaters, and will be released in French theaters on April 4, 2023.

Reception 
The critic Fabien Lermercier of the Cineuropa portal highlighted that the film is "endowed with an eminently convincing cast", and that it "weaves a strange web where the invisible plays with hyperrealism while exploring themes such as truth, family and freedom". Jonathan Holland of Screendaily stated that the film "combines powerful atmospheric elements with suspense and classic tragedy in a haunting and disturbing tone, providing a fresh, sensitive and thoughtful perspective on the cinema of gang culture in Latin America."

References

External links 

 

2022 films
2022 drama films
Colombian drama films
French drama films
2020s Spanish-language films
2020s French films
Films about teenagers
2022 directorial debut films
2020s Colombian films